This is a list of state prisons in the U.S. state of North Dakota.

There are no federal prisons in North Dakota and this list does not include county jails located in North Dakota.  North Dakota does not contract with private prisons.

Adult facilities 

 James River Correctional Center (inmate capacity 365)
 Missouri River Correctional Center (inmate capacity 151)
 North Dakota State Penitentiary
 Dakota Women's Correctional and Rehabilitation Center (inmate capacity 126)

Juvenile facilities 

North Dakota Youth Correctional Center

References

External links
North Dakota Department of Corrections and Rehabilitation website

 
North Dakota
Prisons